Countdown is a 2011 South Korean caper film that takes the audience on an entertaining journey through the underbelly of South Korea. Starring Jeon Do-yeon and Jung Jae-young, this debut feature by Huh Jong-ho premiered at the 2011 Toronto International Film Festival.

Plot
Tae Gun-ho (Jung Jae-young) is the best debt collection agent in his firm, admired by his colleagues and dreaded by those he visits. He’s known for gathering his debts by any means necessary and keeps a cattle prod handy while on the job. Following a series of unexpected fainting spells, Tae is told by a doctor that he has liver cancer, and would need a transplant to have any chance of surviving beyond three months. So, Tae Gun-ho puts his professional skills to work, setting out to collect a different sort of debt by tracking down the recipients of organs donated by his late son. First among his sources for a liver is Cha Ha-yeon (Jeon Do-yeon), a beguiling fraudster with a long list of enemies.

Locating Cha turns out to be easy, since she’s about to be released from prison. The deal she proposes, however, which includes getting even with the sleazy crime boss who set her up, jeopardizes Tae’s future. He struggles desperately to keep Cha, and her liver, safe until the transplant — meanwhile Cha has other plans.

Cast
Jeon Do-yeon as Cha Ha-yeon 
Jung Jae-young as Tae Gun-ho
Min as Jang Hyeon-ji
Lee Geung-young as Jo Myung-suk 
Oh Man-seok as Swy
Kim Dong-wook as Nalpari ("gnat") 	
Jung Man-sik as department head Han
Kwon Hyuk-joon as Yoo-min
Kim Kwang-kyu as Detective Park
Kim Jong-goo as Director Yang
Oh Kwang-rok as Dr. Song
Bae Sung-woo as Dr. Ahn
Choi Jong-ryul as Gun-ho's father
Park Hye-jin as Gun-ho's mother
Bae Yoon-beom as team leader Hong
Noh Hyun-jung as CEO of CMC
Kim Min-jae as Dong office clerk
Jung Hye-sun as granny money lender (cameo)
Song Hye-kyo as pretty girl (cameo)

References

External links
  
 
 
 

2011 films
2011 crime action films
2011 action thriller films
2011 crime thriller films
South Korean crime thriller films
South Korean crime action films
South Korean action thriller films
Films shot in Incheon
Next Entertainment World films
2010s Korean-language films
Sidus Pictures films
2011 directorial debut films
2010s South Korean films